Jism is a 2003 Indian erotic thriller film edited and directed by Amit Saxena, written by Mahesh Bhatt, produced by Pooja Bhatt and Sujit Kumar Singh under the banner Fish Eye Network [P] Ltd and Shreya Creations, which starred John Abraham and Bipasha Basu, the former making his début in Bollywood films. The music for the film was scored by M. M. Keeravani.

The film was inspired by Body Heat (1981).

Plot
Kabir (John Abraham), an unhappy, rather poor, alcoholic lawyer lives a playboy lifestyle in Pondicherry. Kabir's best friends, Siddharth (Vinay Pathak), a policeman and Vishal (Ranvir Shorey), his colleague, try to keep him away from trouble. He meets Sonia Khanna (Bipasha Basu Singh Grover), the beautiful wife of a travelling millionaire, Rohit Khanna (Gulshan Grover).

They have a stormy affair and Kabir finds himself falling madly in love with Sonia. He suggests that she get a divorce, but she says that her husband is capable of killing them both. Sonia finally convinces Kabir to murder her husband and make it look like an accident. She also suggests that they should alter Rohit's will so that she inherits all his property. Kabir tries to reason with her, but she goes ahead and alters the will naming him as executor. Rohit's sister, Priyanka, tries to warn him that Sonia is only interested in money and has already killed Rohit's first wife. Siddharth, who is in charge of the case, suspects Kabir and is caught between friendship and duty. Kabir tries to get Sonia to leave the city with him. It is only when she sends someone to kill him that he realises that all she wants is the money.

Kabir confronts Sonia and she denies that she ever loved him. When he threatens to turn himself in and confess his crime to the police, she shoots him. He's wounded in the abdomen but manages to stand up. Sonia rushes to him as he stands and tells him that she has always loved him. They share a passionate kiss, and then the gun goes off in Sonia's hands. It is revealed that Kabir had shot Sonia in the stomach as he lays her down on the sofa.

He then flees and calls Siddharth and tells him and Vishal to meet him at the beach. They meet Kabir who apologizes to them and says that he just wants to see the sunrise one last time. As they watch the sunrise, Kabir has a vision of Sonia walking towards him. Kabir smiles to himself and then dies of his injury.

Cast

 John Abraham as Advocate Kabir Lal 
 Bipasha Basu as Sonia Khanna 
 Gulshan Grover as Rohit Khanna
 Ranvir Shorey as Vishal Pathak
 Anahita Uberoi as Priyanka Kapoor
 Ayesha Kapur as Anushka Khanna
 Harsh Vashisht as Frankie, a bomb-maker
 Vinay Pathak as DCP Siddharth
 Bobby Bedi
Subhalekha Sudhakar
 Sheeba Chaddha as Sheeba

Music 

The soundtrack of Jism soundtrack was released on 18 December 2002. The music was composed by M. M. Keeravani under the pseudonym M. M. Kreem, with lyrics by Neelesh Misra and Sayeed Quadri. According to the Indian trade website Box Office India, around 1.5 million units of this soundtrack were sold.

Reception

Box office 
Jism grossed  which Box Office India called a "hit".

Critical response
Taran Adarsh of Bollywood Hungama gave the film 2 out of 5 stars, writing "On the whole, JISM exhibits Bipasha Basu's talent and anatomy to its fullest. Coupled with a hot title and eroticism in plenty, the curiosity-value for the film increases manifold. But the subject and its treatment being city-centric, the film will appeal more to the big city audience. The reasonable price at which it is sold at should prove to be advantageous." Deepa Gumaste of Rediff.com wrote "Director Saxena makes a bold debut with Jism and definitely deserves credit for daring to be different. Jism is a first of its kind theme for Bollywood and, therefore, worth a look." India Today stated "Pooja Bhatt's film is not original, but it's good fun."

In 2011, Channel 4 ranked the film No. 92 for its Top 100 sexiest movie scenes poll.

Awards

Sequel
A sequel titled Jism 2, starring Sunny Leone, Randeep Hooda and Arunoday Singh, directed by Pooja Bhatt was released worldwide on 3 August 2012.

References

External links 

2000s erotic thriller films
2000s Hindi-language films
2003 films
Films scored by M. M. Keeravani
Indian erotic thriller films